Wedi 3 (After 3) was Welsh television channel S4C's daily magazine programme featuring specialties from around Wales. It was produced by Tinopolis and as the show's title suggests it was broadcast at 3pm. It had a sister show called Wedi 7 (replaced by Heno in 2012).

Wedi 3 was replaced in 2012 by new magazine show Prynhawn Da. But the new format and look was unpopular so in May 2012 after only a few months the show was once again revamped accordingly. These changes included new titles, a new format and a new set which was strikingly similar to Wedi 3's previous set.

References

S4C original programming